Tenryū Saburō, (November 1, 1903 – August 20, 1989) born Saburō Wakuta in the Hamana District, Shizuoka Prefecture (now Hamamatsu) was a professional sumo wrestler of the Dewanoumi stable. His highest rank was sekiwake.

History
Born the third son of a farmer, Tenryū was known as an intellectual. He was a student in the electrical department of Kawate Technical School when he decided to enroll in professional sumo. He was spotted by former yokozuna Hitachiyama and joined the Dewanoumi stable. He began his career in 1920, under the shikona, or ring name 
, afte a battle near his hometown. He entered the makuuchi division in May 1928 and was promoted to sekiwake in May 1930. He was a rival of Musashiyama and was popular because of his techniques and handsomeness.

The Shunjuen Incident

Tenryū became one of the leader of the  that broke out on January 6, 1932. One day after the January banzuke release, 32 Dewanoumi ichimon (clan) wrestlers gathered at a Chinese restaurant named Shunjuen, located in Tokyo's Oimachi district. They demanded full scale reforms from the Japan Sumo Association to improve the wrestlers living conditions. Subsequently, a number of sekitori from a non-Dewanoumi ichimon, including then sekiwake Minanogawa, joined the protest. The Association was faced with an unprecedented crisis never before seen in the history of professional sumo and responded quickly to the group's demands, but their responses were considered to be half-hearted and lacking in substance, and eventually, the negotiations collapsed.Some theories attribute the launch of the strike due to Tenryū's bitterness from being passed over for ōzeki promotion in favor of his rival. Musashiyama was in fact promoted before Tenryū (from komusubi straight to ōzeki) in the January 1932 tournament while Tenryū remained sekiwake for six consecutive tournament despite having a winning record in each.
Just like his comrade Ōnosato Mansuke, Tenryū cut off his ōichōmage top knot
 and founded with the secessionists the Kansai Sumo Association (Kansai Kakuryoku Kyokai, 関西角力協会) in which he devoted himself as a director. Due to financial problems, the association was however dissolved at the end of 1937.

Later life
Tenryū did not returned in the Japan Sumo Association and worked for a time as secretary and assistant to a Cabinet Minister of then Japanese-occupied Manchuria. There, he established the Manchuria Sumo Association, and helped promote sumo by organizing tournaments and developing young rikishi. In 1939, he invited teachers of Japanese martial arts to Manchuria. He discovered the Aiki-Budo of Morihei Ueshiba and became his student the same day. In subsequent years, he became popular as a sumo commentator on TBS for his dry and acerbic style.

In 1957, the reforms Tenryū had supported were implemented as a norm in professional sumo due to the National Diet implementing the reform. He died on August 20, 1989 at the age of 85.

Career record

See also
Glossary of sumo terms
List of past sumo wrestlers
List of sekiwake

References

Sumo people from Shizuoka Prefecture
1903 births
1989 deaths
Japanese sumo wrestlers